Dry Branch is a  long 3rd order tributary to the Stinking River in Pittsylvania County, Virginia.

Course 
Dry Branch rises about 2 miles southeast of Natal, Virginia and then flows southeast to join the Stinking River about 1.5 miles southwest of Mt. Airy.

Watershed 
Dry Branch drains  of area, receives about 45.2 in/year of precipitation, has a wetness index of 487.85, and is about 38% forested.

See also 
 List of Virginia Rivers

References 

Rivers of Virginia
Rivers of Pittsylvania County, Virginia
Tributaries of the Roanoke River